Dillon Maggard (born 16 October 1995) is an American middle and long-distance runner. He competed collegiately for the Utah State Aggies, where he was a nine-time All American. He now works as an assistant coach for the team. He competed in the 3000 metres at the 2022 World Athletics Indoor Championships, where he placed 9th in the final.

Personal bests
Outdoor
800 metres – 1:51.21 (Boise 2016)
1500 metres – 3:37.43 (Seattle 2019)
Mile – 3:57.76 (Bay Shore 2019)
3000 metres – 7:47.21 (Seattle 2022)
5000 metres – 13:22.94 (Portland 2022)
Indoor
800 metres – 1:52.33 (Boise 2018)
Mile – 4:01.25 (College Station 2019)
3000 metres – 7:46.18 (Beograd 2022)
Two miles – 8:33.28 (New York 2019)
5000 metres – 13:13.62 (Boston 2022)

References

External links
 
 

1995 births
Living people
American male middle-distance runners
American male long-distance runners
Utah State Aggies men's track and field athletes
Sportspeople from Kirkland, Washington